Dietrich Schenk, O.F.M. was a Roman Catholic prelate who served as Auxiliary Bishop of Münster (1394–?).

Biography
Dietrich Schenk was ordained a priest in the Order of Friars Minor. On 14 Jan 1394, he was appointed during the papacy of Pope Boniface IX as Auxiliary Bishop of Münster and Titular Bishop of Athyra. It is uncertain how long he served as Auxiliary Bishop of Münster although in 1404, he was the principal consecrator of Günther von Schwarzburg (archbishop), Archbishop of Magdeburg (1404).

References 

14th-century German Roman Catholic bishops
15th-century German Roman Catholic bishops
Bishops appointed by Pope Boniface IX